Qaleyni (also Romanized as Qāleynī and Qālīnī; also known as Fālīnī and Qāleynī-ye ‘Olyā) is a village in Rahgan Rural District, Khafr District, Jahrom County, Fars Province, Iran. At the 2006 census, its population was 1,152, in 289 families.

References 

Populated places in  Jahrom County